John Alcorn is a Canadian jazz singer who is active in the Toronto jazz scene.

Biography
Born in Toronto, Ontario and raised in Trinidad, Nova Scotia, New Brunswick and New Hampshire, Alcorn returned to Toronto as an adult and began performing in jazz clubs. He released his first album in 1999, and was named Male Vocalist of the Year by the Jazz Report Awards. He also earned a Dora Award in 1997 as music director and composer for Theresa Tova's play Still the Night.

Alcorn has also acted in a number of television films, including Must Be Santa and The Piano Man's Daughter.

Alcorn is the partner of puppeteer and dramatist Ronnie Burkett. His daughter, Coco Love Alcorn, is also a noted Canadian jazz and pop singer.

2017
In January 2017 John Alcorn began a weekly presentation of his "Songbook Series" at the 120 Diner in downtown Toronto.

Discography
 Haunted (1999)
 Quiet Night (2003)
 Flying Without Wings (2015)

References

External links
John Alcorn official website
120 Diner Event Listings

Living people
20th-century Canadian male singers
Cabaret singers
Canadian jazz singers
Canadian jazz songwriters
Canadian people of Irish descent
Dora Mavor Moore Award winners
Gay singers
Canadian LGBT singers
Canadian LGBT songwriters
Gay songwriters
Musicians from Toronto
21st-century Canadian male singers
Canadian gay musicians
Canadian male jazz musicians
Year of birth missing (living people)
21st-century Canadian LGBT people
20th-century Canadian LGBT people